In physics, the Super Tonks–Girardeau gas represents an excited quantum gas phase with strong attractive interactions in a one-dimensional spatial geometry.

Usually, strongly attractive quantum gases are expected to form dense particle clusters and lose all gas-like properties. But in 2005, it was proposed by Stefano Giorgini and co-workers that there is a many body state of attractively interacting bosons that does not decay in one-dimensional systems. If prepared in a special way, this lowest gas-like state should be stable and show new quantum mechanical properties.

Particles in a Super Tonks gas should be strongly correlated and show long range order with a Luttinger Liquid parameter K<1. Since each particle occupies a certain volume, the gas properties are similar to a classical gas of hard rods. Despite the mutual attraction, the single particle wave functions separate and the bosons behave similar to fermions with repulsive, long range interaction.

To prepare the Super Tonks–Girardeau phase it is necessary to increase the repulsive interaction strength all the way through the Tonks–Girardeau regime up to infinity. Sudden switching from infinitely strong repulsive to infinitely attractive interactions stabilizes the gas against collapse and connects the ground state of the Tonks gas to the excited state of the Super Tonks gas.

Experimental realization

See also
Tonks–Girardeau gas

References

External links
 
 
 
 

Condensed matter physics